Baburao Janglu Kale  was an Indian politician. He was elected to the Lok Sabha, the lower house of the Parliament of India as a member of the Indian National Congress.

References

External links
Official biographical sketch in Parliament of India website

India MPs 1971–1977
Lok Sabha members from Maharashtra
1926 births
Year of death missing
Indian National Congress politicians from Maharashtra